Ochthera anatolikos is a species of shore flies in the family Ephydridae.

Distribution
Canada, United States.

References

Ephydridae
Insects described in 1977
Diptera of North America